This list of George Washington University alumni includes numerous prominent politicians, including a recent U.S. Attorney General, four current heads of state or government, CEOs of major corporations, scientists, Nobel laureates, MacArthur fellows, Olympic athletes, Academy Award and Golden Globe winners, royalty, and Time 100 notables.

Academia

 Derek Curtis Bok, President of Harvard University
 John T. Wilson, President of the University of Chicago
 William Lyne Wilson, President of Washington and Lee University
 William Greenleaf Eliot, Founder of Washington University in St. Louis
 Michael K. Young, President of Texas A&M University, the University of Washington, and the University of Utah
 Ernest L. Wilkinson, President of Brigham Young University
 Thomas B. Symons, President of University of Maryland, College Park
 Curley Byrd, President of University of Maryland, College Park
 Scott Cowen, President of Tulane University
 William Carey Crane, President of Baylor University
 Arthur Cutts Willard, President of the University of Illinois system
 Hank Brown, President of the University of Colorado, University of Denver, and University of Northern Colorado
 Walter M. Bortz III, President of Hampden–Sydney College
 Gregory H. Williams, President of the University of Cincinnati and the City College of New York 
 John R. Ryan, Chancellor of the State University of New York and Superintendent of United States Naval Academy
 George F. Baughman, President of the New College of Florida
 Henry Holcombe Tucker, President of the University of Georgia
 Todd B. Hawley, founder of the International Space University
 Lotus Coffman, President of the University of Minnesota
 John T. Fey, President of the University of Vermont and the University of Wyoming
 Robert Ryland, President of the University of Richmond
 H. Edward Flentje, President of Emporia State University 
 Mark Kennedy, President of University of North Dakota
 Glenda Glover, President of Tennessee State University
 Martha Lucas Pate, President of Sweet Briar College
 Myron Augsburger, President of Eastern Mennonite University
 Clinton E. Adams, President of Rocky Vista University
 Ricardo Jaar, President of the University of San Pedro Sula
 Gail Mellow, President of LaGuardia Community College
 Morris G. Steen Jr., President of North Florida Community College
 Michael Kammen, Pulitzer Prize-winning historian at Cornell University
 Alexander Wetmore, 6th Secretary of the Smithsonian Institution
 Irvin D. Yalom, existential psychiatrist and emeritus professor of psychiatry at Stanford University
 Sissela Bok, former Professor of Philosophy at Brandeis University, currently a Senior Visiting Fellow at the Harvard Center for Population and Development Studies, Harvard School of Public Health
 Gustavo A. Mellander, President, Passaic College, Mission College, Chancellor, Inter American University, Chancellor West Valley and Mission College District. Graduate Dean Emeritus, George Mason University. 
 Preston Cloud, eminent earth scientist, biogeologist, cosmologist, and paleontologist whose work led to the development of the concept "Cambrian explosion," for which he coined the phrase "eruptive evolution"
 Bettye Collier-Thomas, founder Mary McLeod Bethune Memorial Museum and National Archives for Black Women's History, award-winning Professor of History at Temple University
 Jack Edmonds, computer scientist, recipient of the John von Neumann Theory Prize, best known for being one of the most important contributors to the field of combinatorial optimization
 Mildred Harnack, literary historian, translator, and resistance fighter in Nazi Germany who was beheaded by the Gestapo
 Roger Pilon, Vice President of the Cato Institute
 Peter Schweizer, President of Government Accountability Institute
 Brooks Hays, Professor at Rutgers University, the University of Massachusetts Amherst, and institute director at Wake Forest University
 Ellyn Kaschak, 1968, emeritus professor of psychology, Ohio State University
 Joseph E. B. Lumbard, Islamic scholar and professor at The American University of Sharjah; author and general editor of The Study Quran
 Cynthia H. Milligan, dean of the College of Business Administration at the University of Nebraska at Lincoln; director of Wells Fargo & Company, Gallup Organization, Calvert investment funds, and W. K. Kellogg Foundation; daughter of United States Secretary of Agriculture Clifford M. Hardin
 Maurice F. Neufeld, professor emeritus, Cornell University
 Charles P. Roland, historian of the American Civil War and the American South, studied at George Washington in 1947 before transferring to Louisiana State University to obtain his PhD
 Bill Baroni, Republican State Senator of New Jersey, former Assemblyman, Adjunct Professor of Law at Seton Hall University School of Law
 Gary Sick, Middle East analyst and academic at the Columbia University School of International and Public Affairs
 Rosalyn Terborg-Penn, African American historian
 Raul Yzaguirre, activist, lifetime member of the Council on Foreign Relations, former president and CEO of the National Council of La Raza, Professor at Arizona State University, one of the first Hispanic fellows of the Institute of Politics at the John F. Kennedy School of Government at Harvard University
 Meyrav Wurmser, Senior Fellow at the Hudson Institute

Business

 Lee Kun-Hee, Chairman of Samsung Group
 Kathy J. Warden, President & CEO of Northrop Grumman
 Neil Portnow, President of The Recording Academy
 Donna Hrinak, President of Boeing Latin America
 Kenneth Lay, CEO and Chairman of Enron
 Elaine Wynn, co-founder of Mirage Resorts and Wynn Resorts
 Ellen Malcolm, founder and President of EMILY's List and IBM heiress
 Van Toffler, President of Viacom Media Networks
 Mindy Grossman, CEO of Weight Watchers Intl.
 Ed Liddy, Chairman of Allstate and AIG
 Henry Cisneros, President of Univision
 Charlotte M. Farmer, PhD, Chief Operating Officer of Underwriters Laboratories Research Institutes
 Gerardo I. Lopez, CEO of Extended Stay America and AMC Theatres
 Nate Morris, co-founder and CEO of Rubicon Global
 Michael Beckerman, CEO of the Internet Association
 Chris Anderson, CEO of 3D Robotics
 Amina Al Rustamani, CEO of the TECOM Group
 William Owens, CEO of Nortel
 Pedro Heilbron, CEO of Copa Holdings, S.A.
 Clayton M. Jones, Chairman of Rockwell Collins
 Anousheh Ansari, CEO of the X Prize Foundation
 Dennis R. Wraase, CEO of Pepco Holdings
 Lawrence R. Goldfarb, CEO of LRG Capital Group
 Christopher J. Wiernicki, CEO of the American Bureau of Shipping
 Joe Rospars, CEO of Blue State Digital
 Douglas Steenland, President & CEO of Northwest Airlines
 Donald Nyrop, President & CEO of Northwest Airlines
 J. R. Claeys, CEO of the National Association of Government Contractors
 Mugo Kibati, CEO of Telkom Kenya
 Sim Shagaya, CEO of Konga.com
 Abby Joseph Cohen, managing director of Goldman Sachs
 Michael Punke, Vice President of Amazon Web Services
 Yasseen Mansour, Egyptian billionaire
 Ron Baron, billionaire founder of Baron Capital; paid a record $103 million for an East Hampton, New York property
 Bill Studeman, former vice president and Deputy general manager of Mission Systems at Northrop Grumman
 James C. Boland, former vice chairman of Ernst & Young; board member of the Goodyear Tire and Rubber Company, Sherwin-Williams, Invacare and DDR Corp.
 Jacob Burns (1924), corporate attorney, educator and philanthropist, former board member at Revlon
 General John T. Chain, Jr., director at R. J. Reynolds Tobacco Company and ConAgra Foods, Inc.
 L. Stanley Crane, Member of National Academy of Engineering; railroad executive; CEO of Southern Railway and Consolidated Rail Corporation
 Linda Fisher, former Deputy Administrator of the Environmental Protection Agency; former Vice President of Monsanto Company; Vice President of DuPont
 Guilford Glazer, real estate developer
 Alvan Macauley, President of Packard
 Afnan Al-Shuaiby, Secretary General of the Arab British Chamber of Commerce
 Stephen G. Haines, organizational theorist and management consultant
 Patricia Roberts Harris, former director at IBM
 David Kellermann, acting CFO of Freddie Mac in early 2009
 Gwendolyn King, former Commissioner of the Social Security Administration; board member at Lockheed-Martin, Countrywide Financial, Pharmacia, and Monsanto Company
 Lester del Rey, founder of Del Rey Books
 Mustafa Koç, President of Koç Holding
General Charles C. Krulak, former Commandant of the United States Marine Corps; board member at ConocoPhillips, Phelps Dodge, Union Pacific; former executive at MBNA
 Theodore Lerner, billionaire real estate developer
 J. Phillip ("Jack") London, author, executive chairman and chairman of the board of CACI International Inc.
 Cynthia H. Milligan, dean of the College of Business Administration at the University of Nebraska at Lincoln, director of Wells Fargo & Company, Gallup Organization, Calvert investment funds, and W.K. Kellogg Foundation, daughter of United States Secretary of Agriculture Clifford M. Hardin
 Darla Moore (MBA), partner of the private investment firm, Rainwater, Inc.; founder of Palmetto Institute; married to the self-made Texan billionaire Richard Rainwater
 Robert Nichols, President and COO of the Financial Services Forum, former Assistant Secretary of the Treasury for Public Affairs
 Roy Nouhra, founder and CEO of ASIS boats
 Admiral Joseph Prueher (1973), former Ambassador to China, former Commander-in-Chief of the United States Pacific Command, former Vice Chief of Naval Operations; a director of Merrill Lynch & Company, Inc., the New York Life Insurance Company, Dyncorp International, Inc. and Fluor Corporation
 John F. W. Rogers, Chief of Staff and partner at Goldman Sachs
 Sim Shagaya, founder and CEO of Konga.com
 George Uribe, founder and CEO of Guestbooker.com

Economics
 Kaushik Basu, Chief Economist of the World Bank
 Lin Jianhai, Secretary General of the International Monetary Fund
 David Klein (PhD '71), Governor of the Bank of Israel
 José Julián Sidaoui, Deputy-Governor of the Bank of Mexico
 Rafael Corpus, Chairman of the Philippine National Bank
 Sandra Pianalto, 10th President of the Federal Reserve Bank of Cleveland
 Julia Montgomery Walsh, Director of the U.S. Chamber of Commerce, first woman to be registered with the American Stock Exchange
 Dan Berger, President and CEO of the National Association of Federally-Insured Credit Unions
 James A. Runde, Vice-Chairman of Morgan Stanley
 Rob Nichols, President & CEO of the American Bankers Association and the Financial Services Forum
 Marc Tucker, founder and President of the National Center on Education and the Economy

Politics

United States

U.S. Cabinet

 William Barr (JD '77), former U.S. Attorney General (1991–1993; 2019–2020)
 Mark Esper (PhD '08), former U.S. Secretary of Defense (2019–2020)
 David Bernhardt (JD '94), current U.S. Secretary of the Interior (2019–2021)
 Colin Powell (MBA '71), 65th U.S. Secretary of State
 John Foster Dulles (JD 1911), 52nd U.S. Secretary of State
 A. Mitchell Palmer, 50th U.S. Attorney General
 John W. Snow (JD '67), 73rd US Secretary of the Treasury
 David M. Kennedy (MA '35, JD '37), 60th United States Secretary of the Treasury
 George B. Cortelyou (LLM 1896), 44th United States Secretary of the Treasury, 1st United States Secretary of Commerce and Labor
 Henry Cisneros (DPA '76), 10th U.S. Secretary of Housing & Urban Development
 Patricia Roberts Harris (JD '60), 6th U.S. Secretary of Housing & Urban Development, 1st U.S. Secretary of Health & Human Services
 George W. Romney, 3rd U.S. Secretary of Housing & Urban Development
 Dan Glickman (JD '69), 26th U.S. Secretary of Agriculture
 Patrick J. Hurley (JD 1908, LLM 1913), 51st U.S. Secretary of War
 William Lyne Wilson (BA 1860), 37th U.S. Postmaster General
 Stephen L. Johnson (MS '76), 11th Administrator of the Environmental Protection Agency
 John Michael McConnell (MPA '86), 2nd Director of National Intelligence
 Susan Schwab (PhD '93), 15th United States Trade Representative
 Mike Young (MBA '91), acting U.S. Secretary of Agriculture (2017)

U.S. Governors

 Mark Warner, 69th Governor of Virginia
 John Garland Pollard, 51st Governor of Virginia
 Harry Hughes, 57th Governor of Maryland
 Thomas Swann, 33rd Governor of Maryland
 Blair Lee, III, interim Governor of Maryland
 Ernest W. Gibson, Jr., 67th Governor of Vermont
 Lee E. Emerson, 69th Governor of Vermont
 Culbert Olson, 29th Governor of California
 Robert P. Casey, 42nd Governor of Pennsylvania
 George W. Romney, 43rd Governor of Michigan
 Frederic Hale Parkhurst, 52nd Governor of Maine
 Fenimore Chatterton, 6th Governor of Wyoming
 James P. Coleman, 52nd Governor of Mississippi
 Mel Carnahan, 51st Governor of Missouri
 Jim Folsom, 42nd Governor of Alabama
 Ruby Laffoon, 43rd Governor of Kentucky
 Frank L. Hagaman, 31st Governor of Kansas
 Adam McMullen, 21st Governor of Nebraska
 Cal Rampton, 11th Governor of Utah
 Grant Sawyer, 21st Governor of Nevada
 Robert E. Smylie, 24th Governor of Idaho
 Wilford Bacon Hoggatt, 6th Governor of the District of Alaska
 Frederick Perry Stanton, interim Governor of the Kansas Territory
 William Edwin Safford, 2nd Military Governor of Guam
 Frank Freyer, 14th Military Governor of Guam
 Walter Philip Leber, 15th Governor of the Panama Canal Zone 
 Pedro Pierluisi, 14th Governor of Puerto Rico 
 Vincent C. Gray, 7th Mayor of the District of Columbia

U.S. Senators

 Elizabeth Warren, current U.S. Senator from Massachusetts (2013–present)
 Mark Warner, current U.S. Senator from Virginia (2009–present)
 Tammy Duckworth, current U.S. Senator from Illinois (2017–present)
 Mike Enzi, former U.S. Senator from Wyoming (1997–2021)
 Daniel Inouye, former U.S. Senator from Hawaii, President pro tempore of the United States Senate
 Robert Byrd, former U.S. Senator from West Virginia, President pro tempore of the United States Senate
 Howard Sutherland, former U.S. Senator from West Virginia
 Harry Reid, former U.S. Senator from Nevada, Senate Majority Leader
 Francis G. Newlands, former U.S. Senator from Nevada (1903–1917)
 J. William Fulbright, U.S. Senator from Arkansas, founder of the Fulbright Program (1945–1974)
 Blair Lee I, former U.S. Senator from Maryland (1914–1917)
 John Warner, former U.S. Senator from Virginia (1979–2009)
 William L. Scott, former U.S. Senator from Virginia
 John Foster Dulles, former U.S. Senator from New York
 Gordon J. Humphrey, former U.S. Senator from New Hampshire (1979–1990)
 Norris Cotton, former U.S. Senator from New Hampshire (1954–1974)
 Hank Brown, former U.S. Senator from Colorado
 William E. Jenner, former U.S. Senator from Indiana
 Daniel Tarbox Jewett - former U.S. Senator from Missouri
 Daniel O. Hastings, former U.S. Senator from Delaware
 Frank Moss, former U.S. Senator from Utah (1959–1977)
 Ernest W. Gibson, Jr., former U.S. Senator from Vermont (1940–1941)
 Jean Carnahan, former U.S. Senator from Missouri (2001–2002)
 Bennett Champ Clark, former U.S. Senator from Missouri (1933–1945)
 Larry Craig, former U.S. Senator from Idaho
 William A. Harris, former U.S. Senator from Kansas
 Kent Conrad, former U.S. Senator from North Dakota
 Jeremiah Denton, former U.S. Senator from Alabama (1981–1987)
 Thomas Swann, elected to the United States Senate but instead served as Governor of Maryland
 Mel Carnahan, posthumously elected to the United States Senate

U.S. Representatives

 Gil Cisneros, U.S. Representative from California (2019–2021)
 Julia Brownley, U.S. Representative from California (2013–present)
 Darren Soto, U.S. Representative from Florida (2017–present)
 Neal Dunn, U.S. Representative from Florida (2017–present)
 Sam Johnson, U.S. Representative from Texas (1991–present)
 Susan Wild, U.S. Representative from Pennsylvania (2018–present)
 William Timmons, U.S. Representative from South Carolina (2019–present)
 John James Duncan, Jr., U.S. Representative from Tennessee (1988–present)
 Pedro Pierluisi, Democratic Resident Commissioner of Puerto Rico to the House
 E. Ross Adair, Republican from Indiana, 1951–1971, later Ambassador to Ethiopia
 Jason Altmire (1998), Democrat from Pennsylvania, 2007–2013
 Henry Moore Baker, Republican from New Hampshire, former state representative, 1893–1897, later a State Representative
 Michael D. Barnes, Democrat from Maryland
 Bob Barr (1972), former Republican from Georgia, 1995–2003,
 Henry W. Barry, Republican from Mississippi, former state senator, 1870–1875
 James F. Battin, Republican from Montana,
 Helen Delich Bentley, Republican from Maryland, 1985–1995
 Michael Bilirakis (1960), Republican from Florida, 1983–2007
 Vincente T. Blaz, Republican from Guam, Brigadier General, 1985–1993
 Charles Harrison Brown, Democrat from Missouri, 1957–1961
 Garry E. Brown, Republican from Michigan, 1967–1979
 Hank Brown, Republican from Colorado, former state senator, 1981–1991, later US Senator
 Joel Broyhill, Republican from Virginia, chairman of the Rules Committee, 1953–1974
 Sherman Everett Burroughs, Republican from New Hampshire, former state representative, 1917–1923
 Laurence J. Burton, Republican from Utah, 1963–1971, unsuccessful candidate for US Senate
 Robert Byrd (attended), Democrat from West Virginia, former state delegate and senator, 1953–1959, US Senator
 Goodloe Byron, Democrat from Maryland, former State Delegate and Senator, 1971–1978
 John L. Cable, Republican from Ohio, 1921–1925 and 1929–1933
 Gordon Canfield (1926), Republican from New Jersey, 1941–1961
 Eric Cantor (1985), Republican from Virginia, former Chief Deputy Whip, Minority Whip, 2001–2010, House Majority Leader, 2011–2014
 Lewis C. Carpenter, Republican from South Carolina, 1874–1875
 Donna Christian-Christensen, Democrat from the United States Virgin Islands, non-voting delegate, 1997–2015
 William Henry Coleman, Republican from Pennsylvania, 1915–1917
 Frank Coombs, Republican from California, former state assemblyman and speaker, 1901–1903
 John Blaisdell Corliss, Republican from Michigan, 1895–1903
 Norris Cotton, Republican from New Hampshire, 1947–1954, later US Senator
 William R. Coyle, Republican from Pennsylvania, 1925–1927 and 1929–1933
 Larry Craig, Republican from Idaho, 1981–1991, US Senator, 1991–2009
 Josiah Crudup, Republican from North Carolina, 1821–1823
 Charles F. Curry, Jr., Republican from California, 1931–1933
 Ewin L. Davis, Democrat from Tennessee 1919–1933
 Martin Dies, Jr., Democrat from Texas; co-founder and chairman of the House Committee Investigating Un-American Activities, 1931–1945 and 1953–1959
 Donald C. Dobbins, Democrat from Illinois, 1933–1937
 Clyde T. Ellis, Democrat from Arkansas, former state representative and Senator, 1939–1943
 John James Flynt, Jr., Democrat from Georgia, 1954–1979
 John H. Foster, Republican from Indiana, 1905–1909
 J. William Fulbright, Democrat from Arkansas, 1943–1945, later US Senator
 Ralph A. Gamble, Republican from New York, 1937–1957
 Stephen Warfield Gambrill, Democrat from Maryland, 1924–1938
 Dan Glickman (JD 1969), Democrat from Kansas, former chairman of the Intelligence Committee, 1977–1995, former United States Secretary of Agriculture
 Gilbert Gude, Republican from Maryland, former state delegate and senator, 1967–1977
 Orval H. Hansen, Republican from Idaho, former state representative and Senator, 1969–1975
 William A. Harris, Populist from Kansas, 1893–1895, later a state senator and then US Senator, 1897–1903, unsuccessful candidate for governor
 Franck R. Havenner, Progressive and then Democrat from California, 1937–1941 and 1945–1953
 Brooks Hays, Democrat from Arkansas, 1943–1959
 George Huddleston, Jr., Democrat from Alabama, 1963–1965
 Merlin Hull, Republican from Wisconsin, former member of the Wisconsin State Assembly, former Speaker, former Wisconsin Secretary of State, 1929–1931 and 1935–1953
 Henry S. Reuss, Democratic from Wisconsin
 William Y. Humphreys, Democrat from Mississippi, 1923–1925
 Daniel Inouye (JD 1952), Democrat from Hawaii 1959–1963, former US Senator
 Steve Israel (1985), Democrat from New York, 2001–2017
 Frank M. Karsten, Democrat from Missouri, 1947–1969
 Tom Kindness, Republican from Ohio
 Robert W. Levering, Democrat of Ohio
 Albert F. Dawson, Republican from Iowa
 Tim Mahoney (1983), Democrat from Florida, 2007–2009
 Henry May, Democrat from Maryland, 1853–1855 and 1861–1863
 Donald H. McLean, Republican from New Jersey, 1933–1945
 Herbert Alton Meyer, Republican from Kansas, 1947–1950
 Earl C. Michener, Republican from Michigan, chairman of the Judiciary Committee, 1919–1933 and 1935–1951
 Edward Tylor Miller, Republican from Maryland, 1947–1959, unsuccessful candidate for US Senate
 Francis G. Newlands (JD 1869), Democrat from Nevada, 1893–1903, later US Senator
 William H. Parker, Republican from South Dakota, 1907–1908
 Stanford E. Parris, Republican from Virginia, former State Delegate, 1973–1975 and 1981–1991
 James T. Patterson, Republican from Connecticut, 1947–1959
 Nick Rahall, Democrat from West Virginia, 1977–2015
 Jim Ramstad (1973), Republican from Minnesota, 1991–2009
 Harry Reid (JD 1964), Democrat from Nevada, former lieutenant governor, 1983–1987, former US Senator
 John Merriman Reynolds, Republican from Pennsylvania, 1905–1911; later Lieutenant Governor of Pennsylvania
 John M. Robsion, Jr., Republican from Kentucky, 1953–1959, unsuccessful candidate for governor
 Paul Rogers, Democrat from Florida, 1955–1979
 Alvah Sabin, from Vermont, former state representative and Senator, as well as state secretary of state, 1853–1857
 William L. Scott, Republican from Virginia, 1967–1973, later US Senator
 James Shannon, Democrat from Massachusetts, 1979–1985, later Massachusetts Attorney General
 Joe Skubitz, Republican from Kansas, 1963–1978
 Gladys Noon Spellman, Democrat from Maryland, 1975–1981
 Frederick Perry Stanton, Democrat from Tennessee, chairman of the Committee on Naval Affairs, chairman of the Judiciary Committee, 1845–1855, later Governor of Kansas
 Cliff Stearns (1963), Republican from Florida, 1989–2013
 Howard Sutherland, Republican from West Virginia, former state senator, 1913–1917
 Thomas Swann, Democrat from Maryland, former governor and mayor of Baltimore, elected to the US Senate but did not serve, 1869–1879
 E. S. Johnny Walker, Democrat from New Mexico, former state representative, 1965–1969
 Francis E. Walter, Democrat of Pennsylvania, chairman of the Committee on Un-American Activities, 1933–63
 Elton Watkins, Democrat from Oregon, 1923–1925, unsuccessful candidate for US Senate and Mayor of Portland
 Guilford Wiley Wells, Independent Republican from Mississippi, former US Attorney, 1875–1877
 Robert Wexler (1985), former state senator, Democrat from Florida, 1997–2010
 Compton I. White, Jr., Democrat of Idaho, 1963–1967
 Earle D. Willey, former Delaware Secretary of State, Republican from Delaware, 1943–1945
 William Lyne Wilson, Democrat from West Virginia, chairman of the Committee on Ways and Means, 1883–1895, later United States Postmaster General
 Jared Moskowitz, Democrat from Florida
 Jill Tokuda, Democrat from Hawaii 
 Erin Houchin, Republican from Indiana

U.S. mayors

 David Holt, current Mayor of Oklahoma City
 Vincent C. Gray, former Mayor of Washington, D.C.
 Richard Wallach, former Mayor of Washington, D.C.
 Walter Nathan Tobriner, former Mayor of Washington, D.C.
 Henry B. F. MacFarland, former Mayor of Washington, D.C.
 W. M. Holland, former Mayor of Dallas
 Nick Udall, former Mayor of Phoenix
 Henry Cisneros, former Mayor of San Antonio
 Harold L. George, former Mayor of Beverly Hills
 George W. Guthrie, former Mayor of Pittsburgh
 Rocky Anderson, former Mayor of Salt Lake City
 William S. Fitzgerald, former Mayor of Cleveland
 Frank E. Mann, former Mayor of Alexandria
 Leroy S. Bendheim, former Mayor of Alexandria
 Franklin P. Backus, former Mayor of Alexandria
 Thomas Swann, former Mayor of Baltimore
 James Taylor Ellyson, former Mayor of Richmond
 Steven L. Abrams, former Mayor of Boca Raton
 Dorothy Wilken, former Mayor of Boca Raton
 Frank Willey Clancy, former Mayor of Albuquerque
 John H. Logie, former Mayor of Grand Rapids
 Alex Knopp, former Mayor of Norwalk
 Tom Rust, former Mayor of Herndon, Virginia
 John Garland Pollard, former Williamsburg, Virginia
 George B. Fitch, former Mayor of Warrenton, Virginia
 William Henry Coleman, former Mayor of McKeesport, Pennsylvania
 Hector De La Torre, former Mayor of South Gate, California
 Skip Priest, former Mayor of Federal Way, Washington
 Scott Slifka, former Mayor of West Hartford, Connecticut
 Susan Bass Levin, former Mayor of Cherry Hill, New Jersey
 Elizabeth C. Hoffman, former Mayor of North Tonawanda, New York
 Tom Van Horn Moorehead, former Mayor of Zanesville, Ohio
 Tom Kindness, former Mayor of Hamilton, Ohio
 Gretchen Driskell, former Mayor of Saline, Michigan
 Susan W. Kluttz, former Mayor of Salisbury, North Carolina
 Kenneth S. Wherry, former Mayor of Pawnee City, Nebraska
 Compton I. White Jr., former Mayor of Clark Fork, Idaho
 Robert K. Goodwin, former Mayor of Redfield, Iowa
 James L. Wilmeth, former Mayor of Takoma Park, Maryland
 William V. Bouic, former Mayor of Rockville, Maryland
 Mike Enzi, former Mayor of Gillette, Wyoming
 Keith Sebelius, former Mayor of Norton, Kansas

Other U.S. officials

 Bill McGinley, White House Cabinet Secretary
 Mercedes Schlapp, White House Director of Strategic Communications
 Russell Vought, Director of the Office of Management and Budget
 Lauren Vaughan, Secretary of the District of Columbia
 Tony Sayegh, United States Assistant Secretary of the Treasury
 Carlos Del Toro, current United States Secretary of the Navy
 Aaron D. Ford, current Attorney General of Nevada
 Dennis Herrera, current City Attorney of San Francisco
 Corey Johnson, current Speaker of New York City Council
 Atif Qarni, current Virginia Secretary of Education
 Dan Maffei, current Commissioner of the Federal Maritime Commission
 Eddie Farnsworth, current President pro tempore of the Arizona Senate
 José R. Rodríguez, current Minority Leader of Texas Senate
 Ram Villivalam, current member of the Illinois Senate
 Caroline Simmons, current member of the Connecticut Senate
 Karl Rhoads, current member of the Hawaii Senate
 Rob Wagner, current member of the Oregon State Senate
 Julie Raque Adams, current member of the Kentucky Senate
 Mari Manoogian, current member of the Michigan House of Representatives
 JB McCuskey, current State Auditor of West Virginia
 Charles Manatt, former Chairman of the Democratic National Committee
 William B. Black Jr., 16th Deputy Director of the National Security Agency
 Gwendolyn King, former Commissioner of the Social Security Administration
 Frank Harris Hitchcock, former Chairman of the Republican National Committee
 Lewis Deschler, first Parliamentarian of the United States House of Representatives
 Dionel M. Aviles, Under Secretary of the Navy, former Assistant Secretary of the Navy
 Victoria Clarke, former Assistant Secretary of Defense for Public Affairs
 Kathleen Troia McFarland, former Deputy Assistant Secretary of Defense for Public Affairs
 B. J. Penn, Assistant Secretary of the Navy (2005–2009)
 John P. Roth, Assistant Secretary of the Air Force
 Robert F. Hale, Under Secretary of Defense
 Robert O. Work, 32nd United States Deputy Secretary of Defense
 David O. Cooke, "Mayor of the Pentagon"
 Rosel H. Hyde, Chairman of the Federal Communications Commission
 Tom Bossert, United States Homeland Security Advisor for President Donald Trump
 Charles Colson, White House Counsel for President Richard Nixon
 Gregory G. Garre, United States Solicitor General
 Jack Conway, Attorney General of Kentucky
 Kevin J. O'Connor, former United States Associate Attorney General
 Diana Josephson, Under Secretary of Commerce for Oceans and Atmosphere
 Charles James, assistant attorney general and general counsel of Chevron-Texaco
 Catherine M. Russell, chief of staff to Jill Biden, wife of Joseph Biden, former associate deputy attorney general
 Bradley Schlozman, former head of the United States Department of Justice Civil Rights Division and current US Attorney for the Western District of Missouri
 Alexander Butterfield, Administrator of the Federal Aviation Administration
 Erin Houchin, member of the Indiana Senate
 Katie Walsh, former White House Deputy Chief of Staff
 Donna Lynne, 49th Lieutenant Governor of Colorado
 Kenneth W. Starr (1968), United States Solicitor General, and Independent Counsel during the Whitewater and Monica Lewinsky scandals
 Ross "Rocky" Anderson (JD 1978), former mayor of Salt Lake City, Utah
 Willie Bailey, Democratic member of the Mississippi House of Representatives
 Gary J. Barczak, former Democratic member of the Wisconsin State Assembly
 Bill Baroni, Republican State Senator of New Jersey, former Assemblyman, Adjunct Professor of Law at Seton Hall University School of Law
 Edward Blackmon Jr., Democratic member of the Mississippi House of Representatives
 Winston Bryant, former Attorney General of Arkansas
 Charlie Collins, Republican member of the Arkansas House of Representatives for the 84th district
 Roger Cressey, member of the United States National Security Council
 Tim Morrison, member of the United States National Security Council 
 M. Jerome Diamond, Vermont Attorney General, 1975–1981
 Randall Edwards (MBA 1990), Oregon State Treasurer
 Harland E. Everson, former Democratic member of the Wisconsin State Assembly
 Sean Flaherty, Democratic member of the Maine House of Representatives
 Richard A. Flintrop, former Democratic member of the Wisconsin State Assembly
 Hillman Terome Frazier, Democratic state senator of Mississippi, former state representative
 Vivian V. Simpson, first female Secretary of State of Maryland
 Robert J. Garagiola, Democratic member of the Maryland State Senate
 James W. Gilchrist, Democratic member of the Maryland House of Delegates
 Ana Sol Gutierrez, Democratic member of the Maryland House of Delegates
 Murray D. Levy, Democratic member of the Maryland House of Delegates
 Christopher B. Shank, Democratic member of the Maryland House of Delegates
 Karen S. Montgomery, Democratic member of the Maryland House of Delegates
 Tom Greenwell, first Republican judge of the 319th District Court in Corpus Christi
 Paul Clinton Harris, Republican former member of the Virginia House of Delegates
 David Holt, Current Mayor of Oklahoma City, OK
 Raymond Johnson, Republican former member of the Wisconsin State Senate
 Rod Johnston, Republican former member of the Wisconsin State Senate
 Alex Knopp, eight-term member of the Connecticut House of Representatives (1987–2001) and two term mayor of Norwalk, Connecticut (2001–2005); clinical Lecturer at Yale Law School (since 2006)
 Jared Moskowitz, former member of the Florida House of Representatives
 Gretchen Driskell, former member of the Michigan House of Representatives
 Susan Bass Levin, former Mayor of Cherry Hill, New Jersey, former Commissioner of the New Jersey Department of Community Affairs, current deputy executive director of the Port Authority of New York and New Jersey
 Frank E. Mann, former Democratic member of the Virginia House of Delegates
 Jesse Martineau, Democratic member of the New Hampshire House of Representatives
 Kenneth E. Melson, former director of the Bureau of Alcohol, Tobacco, Firearms and Explosives
 Bill Mims, former Republican State Delegate and former member of the Senate of Virginia, current Attorney General of Virginia
 Daniel J. O'Donnell, Democratic member of the New York State Assembly
 Leslie Osterman (1991), Republican member of the Kansas House of Representatives
 John Overington, Republican member of the West Virginia House of Delegates
 Jeffrey Piccola, Republican member of the Pennsylvania State Senate
 Paul G. Pinsky, former Democratic Delegate and current member of the Maryland State Senate
 John Merriman Reynolds, US Representative from Pennsylvania and then Lieutenant Governor of Pennsylvania
 Thomas Davis Rust, Republican member of the Virginia House of Delegates
 James Shannon, former US Representative and Massachusetts Attorney General
 James Skoufis, Democratic member of New York State Assembly elected to State Senate in 2018
 Harry A. Slattery, US Under Secretary of the Interior, 1938–39; the Slattery Report
 Darren Soto, Democrat, Florida House of Representatives
 Ben Stevens, former President of the Alaska State Senate, son of United States Senator Ted Stevens
 Nick Udall, former mayor of Phoenix, Arizona, 1948–52, member of the Udall family
 Colin Van Ostern, New Hampshire Executive Council member and New Hampshire Gubernatorial candidate
 Leo Wardrup, former Republican member of the Virginia House of Delegates
 Mary Margaret Whipple, former Democratic State Delegate and current member of the Senate of Virginia
 Charles W. Colson, chief counsel for US President Richard Nixon, spent time in prison for his part in the Watergate scandal
 Harry S. Dent, Sr. (JD, 1957), Special Counsel to President Richard Nixon; General Counsel to the Republican National Committee; father of economist Harry Dent
 Elizabeth B. Drewry (BA, MA), archivist, National Archives and the Franklin D. Roosevelt Presidential Library and Museum
 Lori Garver, Deputy NASA Administrator
 Steven M. Goldman, New Jersey State Commissioner of Banking and Insurance
 Michael Griffin, NASA Administrator
 Kenneth R. Harding (1937), former Sergeant at Arms of the United States House of Representatives
 Heather Higginbottom, Deputy Assistant to the President for Domestic Policy in the administration of Barack Obama
 Leon Jaworski (1926), Special Prosecutor for the Watergate hearings
 Gwendolyn King, former Commissioner of the Social Security Administration; board member at Lockheed-Martin, Countrywide Financial, Pharmacia, and Monsanto Company
 Susan Bass Levin, former Mayor of Cherry Hill, New Jersey, former Commissioner of the New Jersey Department of Community Affairs, current deputy executive director of the Port Authority of New York and New Jersey
 Dominic J. Monetta, former deputy director of Defense Research and Engineering (Research and Advanced Technology) at the U.S. Department of Defense, 1991–1993; former director, Office of New Production Reactors, at the United States Department of Energy, 1989–1991
 Kenneth P. Moritsugu (M.D. 1971), Surgeon General of the United States (August 2006–present)
 Robert Nichols, President and COO of the Financial Services Forum, former Assistant Secretary of the Treasury for Public Affairs
 Patrick P. O'Carroll, Jr, Inspector General of the Social Security Administration
 Maria Pallante (1990), current U.S. Register of Copyrights
 Marybeth Peters (1971), former U.S. Register of Copyrights
 Margaret Milner Richardson, Commissioner of Internal Revenue (or IRS Commissioner), head of the Internal Revenue Service, former partner at Ernst & Young
 Mary Schapiro, former chairwoman of the U.S. Securities and Exchange Commission, former CEO of the Financial Industry Regulatory Authority, former chairman and CEO of the National Association of Securities Dealers, former chairman of the Commodity Futures Trading Commission, former commissioner on the Securities and Exchange Commission, currently a director of Kraft Foods Inc, and Duke Energy Corporation
 James E. Webb (1936), second administrator of NASA
 William Lyne Wilson, 37th United States Postmaster General, former Ways and Means chairman in the US House of Representatives
 Aldrich Ames, Soviet spy working in the CIA as a counter-intelligence officer
 Allen Dulles (1920), director of the CIA
 James W. McCord, Jr., former CIA officer, involved in the Watergate scandal
 John A. Rizzo, Acting General Counsel of the CIA
 Bill Studeman, former Admiral of the United States Navy, former deputy director of the CIA, former acting director of Central Intelligence, former director of the National Security Agency, and former director of Naval Intelligence
 A. Bruce Bielaski, director of the Bureau of Investigation, predecessor to the FBI
 Floyd I. Clarke, former director of the FBI
 Sibel Edmonds, former FBI translator, founder of the National Security Whistleblowers Coalition
 W. Mark Felt (1940), associate director, FBI; "Deep Throat" informant
 Stanley Finch (JD 1908), first director of the Bureau of Investigation
 L. Patrick Gray, former acting director of the FBI during the Watergate scandal
 J. Edgar Hoover (1916, 1917, 1935), director, FBI
 Eric O'Neill (JD 2003), FBI agent whose work led to the arrest and life imprisonment conviction of Robert Hanssen
 John P. O'Neill, former top anti-terrorism expert; former assistant director in the Federal Bureau of Investigation; head of security at the World Trade Center; died in the September 11, 2001 attacks
 Clyde Tolson, associate director of the FBI, protégé of FBI director J. Edgar Hoover

International

Heads of state and government
 Juan Guaidó (MPA '09), disputed President of Venezuela (2019–present)
 Kolinda Grabar-Kitarović (F.S. '03), former President of Croatia (2015–2020)
 Faure Gnassingbé (MBA '97), current President of Togo (2005–present)
 Edward David Burt (BA '01, MS '03), current Premier of Bermuda (2017–present)
 Michael Dunkley (MS '80), 12th Premier of Bermuda (2014–2017)
 Tshering Wangchuk (LLM '03), interim Prime Minister of Bhutan (2018)
 Chimediin Saikhanbileg (LLM '02), Prime Minister of Mongolia (2014–2016)
 Syngman Rhee (BA 1907), 1st President of South Korea (1948–1960)
 Lee Myung-bak (V.S. '99), 17th President of South Korea (2008–2013)
 Chang Dae-whan (MA '76), Prime Minister of South Korea (2002)
 Song Yo Chan (BA '40), Prime Minister of South Korea (1961–1962)
 Shahid Khaqan Abbasi, (MEA '83) 21st Prime Minister of Pakistan (2017–2018)
 Mandé Sidibé (MBA '74), 8th Prime Minister of Mali (2000–2002)
 Mikhail Saakashvili (LLM '94), 3rd President of Georgia (2004–2007, 2008–2013)
 Ghazi Mashal Ajil al-Yawer (MA '85), President of Iraq (2004–2005)
 Mahmud Suleiman Maghribi (PhD '73), Prime Minister of Libya (1969–1970)

Cabinet ministers

 Mohammad Nahavandian, current Vice President of Iran
 Hessa Al Jaber, former Minister of Information of Qatar
 John Deng, current Minister without Portfolio of Taiwan
 Omar Ayub Khan, current Energy Minister of Pakistan (grandson of President Muhammad Ayub Khan)
 Luhut Binsar Pandjaitan, current Minister of Maritime Affairs of Indonesia
 Slim Feriani, Former Minister of Industry, Energy, Mining, Renewable Energy and SMEs, Republic of Tunisia
 Alexander Zaveryukha, former Deputy Prime Minister of Russia
 Nematullah Shahrani, former Vice President of Afghanistan
 S. M. Krishna, former Foreign Minister of India 
 Ashtar Ausaf Ali, former Attorney-General for Pakistan
 Shahid Khaqan Abbasi, former Minister of Petroleum & Natural Resources of Pakistan
 Lee Beom Seok, former Foreign Minister of South Korea
 Joanna Shields, Baroness Shields, former Minister for Internet Safety & Security of the United Kingdom
 Jorge Alberto Uribe, former Defense Minister of Colombia
 Pedro Sánchez Gamarra, former Energy Minister of Peru
 Sérgio Paulo Rouanet, former Minister of Culture of Brazil
 Roberto Campos, former Minister of Planning of Brazil
 Marcin Święcicki, former Minister of Economic Relations of Poland
 Ali bin Abdulla Al Kaabi, former Labour Minister of the United Arab Emirates
 Mansour bin Mutaib Al Saud, former Minister of Municipal Affairs of Saudi Arabia
 Raya Haffar al-Hassan, former Finance Minister of Lebanon
 Hedayat Amin Arsala, former Foreign Minister of Afghanistan 
 Géza Teleki, former Education Minister of Hungary
 Aleksandre Jejelava, former Science & Education Minister of Georgia
 Khatuna Kalmakhelidze, former Minister of Corrections of Georgia
 Yahya Kisbi, former Jordanian Minister of Public Works and Housing.
 Mihnea Motoc, former Defense Minister of Romania
 Sudirman Said, former Energy Minister of Indonesia
 Farouq Qasrawi, former Foreign Minister of Jordan
 Alaa Batayneh, former Energy Minister of Jordan
 Mohammad Nidal al-Shaar, former Minister of Economy & Trade of Syria
 Mohammad Mustafa, former Deputy Prime Minister of Palestine
 Kao Su-po, former Minister of Mongolian & Tibetan Affairs of Taiwan
 Kivutha Kibwana, former Defense Minister of Kenya
 Zhivargo Laing, former Culture Minister of the Bahamas
 Htay Aung, former Tourism Minister of Myanmar
 Sandiaga Salahuddin Uno, current Minister of Tourism and Creative Economy of Indonesia, former Vice Governor of Jakarta, Indonesia
 Rex Gatchalian, current Philippines Secretary of Social Welfare and Development, former Member Philippine House of Representatives from Valenzuela, former Mayor of Valenzuela

Other figures

 Tshering Wangchuk, current Chief Justice of the Supreme Court of Bhutan
 Anwar Gargash, current Minister of State for Foreign Affairs of the United Arab Emirates
 Mauricio Vila Dosal, current Governor of Yucatán, former Mayor of Mérida
 Najmiddin Karim, current Governor of Kirkuk
 Joanna Shields, Baroness Shields, current Member of the House of Lords
 Andrew Hastie, current member of the Parliament of Australia
 George Maior, current Romanian ambassador to the United States
 İbrahim Kalın, current Press Secretary of the President of Turkey
 Pearnel Patroe Charles Jr., current Minister of Foreign Affairs & Trade of Jamaica
 Hsu Mo, founding judge of the International Court of Justice
 José Abad Santos (1909), Chief Justice of the Supreme Court of the Philippines
 Philip Jaisohn, a founding father of the Korean Independence Movement
 Chung Mong-joon, Chairman of the Liberty Korea Party
 HH Prince Talal Arslan, Druze leader and current Head of the House of Arslan; founder and President of the Lebanese Democratic Party
 Joe Hung (PhD history, 1981), Taiwanese journalist (Central News Agency) and diplomat, Representative of Taiwan to Italy (1993–2000)
 Kazuyuki Hamada, former Vice Minister of Foreign Affairs of Japan
 Henrique Valle, Deputy Ambassador of Brazil to the United Nations
 José Julián Sidaoui, Deputy Minister of Finance of Mexico
 Andrew Marshall, Director of the Office of Net Assessment
 Sarah Adwoa Safo, member of the Parliament of Ghana
 Abdul Kady Karim, 2007 candidate for President of Sierra Leone
 Camillo Gonsalves, Permanent Representatives of Saint Vincent and the Grenadines to the United Nations
 Vidar Bjørnstad, Member of the Norwegian Parliament
 Marcin Święcicki, Mayor of Warsaw, Poland
 Dianne Haskett, Mayor of London, Canada
 Donald Stone Macdonald, Mayor of Gwangju, South Korea

Diplomacy

U.S. Ambassadors

 Rebecca Gonzales, current U.S. Ambassador to Lesotho 
 Robin Bernstein, former U.S. Ambassador to the Dominican Republic
 Christine A. Elder, former U.S. Ambassador to Liberia 
 Joseph Prueher, former U.S. Ambassador to China
 Nelson T. Johnson, former U.S. Ambassador to China and Australia
 Patrick J. Hurley, former U.S. Ambassador to China and New Zealand
 James R. Lilley, former U.S. Ambassador to China and South Korea
 Stephen W. Bosworth, former U.S. Ambassador to Tunisia, Philippines, and South Korea
 John J. Muccio, former U.S. Ambassador to Guatemala, Iceland, South Korea
 Michael Punke, former U.S. Ambassador to the World Trade Organization
 Kurt Volker, former U.S. Ambassador to NATO
 David M. Kennedy, former U.S. Ambassador to NATO
 William Tapley Bennett Jr., U.S. Ambassador to NATO
 Catherine M. Russell, former U.S. Ambassador-at-Large for Global Women's Issues
 Patricia Roberts Harris, former U.S. Ambassador to Luxembourg
 Wiley T. Buchanan Jr., former U.S. Ambassador to Luxembourg and Austria
 John Cloud, former U.S. Ambassador to Lithuania and Germany
 Thomas A. Loftus, former U.S. Ambassador to Norway
 Edward W. Gnehm, former U.S. Ambassador to Jordan, Kuwait and Australia 
 George W. Guthrie, former U.S. Ambassador to Japan
 Robert Daniel Murphy, former U.S. Ambassador to Japan and Belgium
 Carol Z. Perez, former U.S. Ambassador to Chile
 William Miller Collier, former U.S. Ambassador to Chile and Spain
 Alexander W. Weddell, former U.S. Ambassador to Argentina and Spain
 John H. Wheeler, former U.S. Ambassador to Nicaragua
 Cresencio S. Arcos Jr., former U.S. Ambassador to Honduras
 Charles A. Ford, former U.S. Ambassador to Honduras
 Frank Almaguer, former U.S. Ambassador to Honduras
 Morris D. Busby, former U.S. Ambassador to Colombia
 William Braucher Wood, former U.S. Ambassador to Colombia and Afghanistan
 Charles Taylor Manatt, former U.S. Ambassador to Dominican Republic
 Raul Yzaguirre, former U.S. Ambassador to Dominican Republic
 Donna Hrinak, former U.S. Ambassador to Dominican Republic, Bolivia, and Venezuela
 George W. Landau former U.S. Ambassador to Paraguay, Chile, and Venezuela
 James M. Derham, former U.S. Ambassador to Guatemala
 Frank V. Ortiz, former U.S. Ambassador to Uruguay, Guatemala, Barbados, Peru, and Argentina
 Richard C. Brown, former U.S. Ambassador to Uruguay
 Lyle Franklin Lane, former U.S. Ambassador to Uruguay
 Thomas J. Dodd, Jr., former U.S. Ambassador to Uruguay and Costa Rica
 Robert M. Sayre, former U.S. Ambassador to Brazil, Panama, and Uruguay
 Irving Bedell Dudley, former U.S. Ambassador to Brazil and Peru
 Charles Page Bryan, former U.S. Ambassador to Brazil, Japan, Belgium, and Portugal
 Everett E. Briggs, former U.S. Ambassador to Portugal
 Robert J. McCloskey, former U.S. Ambassador to Greece, Cyprus, and Netherlands
 John Peurifoy, former U.S. Ambassador to Greece, Guatemala, and Thailand
 Richard Boucher, former U.S. Ambassador to Cyprus
 Theodore Brentano, former U.S. Ambassador to Hungary
 William Dale Montgomery, U.S. Ambassador to Bulgaria, Serbia and Montenegro, and Croatia
 E. Ross Adair, former U.S. Ambassador to Ethiopia
 Tibor P. Nagy, former U.S. Ambassador to Ethiopia
 David H. Shinn, former U.S. Ambassador to Ethiopia and Burkina Faso
 Julius Waring Walker Jr., former U.S. Ambassador to Burkina Faso
 Smith Hempstone, former U.S. Ambassador to Kenya
 Gerald Eustis Thomas, former U.S. Ambassador to Kenya and Guyana
 David C. Halsted, former U.S. Ambassador to Chad and Uganda
 Tom McDonald, former U.S. Ambassador to Zimbabwe
 Bernadette M. Allen, former U.S. Ambassador to Niger
 Robert Brendon Keating, former U.S. Ambassador to Madagascar
 George Moose, former U.S. Ambassador to Benin and Senegal
 Robert P. Jackson, former U.S. Ambassador to Ghana and Cameroon
 Donald C. Johnson, former U.S. Ambassador to Cabo Verde, Equatorial Guinea, and Mongolia
 Francis Terry McNamara, former U.S. Ambassador to Cabo Verde, Gabon, and São Tomé and Príncipe
 Aubrey Hooks, former U.S. Ambassador to Democratic Republic of the Congo, Ivory Coast, and Republic of Congo
 Clare H. Timberlake, former U.S. Ambassador to Democratic Republic of the Congo
 Harmon Elwood Kirby, former U.S. Ambassador to Togo
 Edward Peck, former U.S. Ambassador to Mauritania
 Daniel A. Johnson, former U.S. Ambassador to Suriname
 Walter Nathan Tobriner, former U.S. Ambassador to Jamaica
 Walter E. North, former U.S. Ambassador to Vanuatu, Solomon Islands, and Papua New Guinea
 William A. Heidt, former U.S. Ambassador to Cambodia
 Carol Laise, former U.S. Ambassador to Nepal
 Edward E. Masters, former U.S. Ambassador to Indonesia
 Ralph L. Boyce, former U.S. Ambassador to Indonesia and Thailand
 Sheila Gwaltney, former U.S. Ambassador to Kyrgyzstan
 Marisa Lino, former U.S. Ambassador to Albania
 Gina Abercrombie-Winstanley, former U.S. Ambassador to Malta
 Richard L. Baltimore, former U.S. Ambassador to Oman
 Ross Wilson, former U.S. Ambassador to Turkey

State Department officials

 Colin Powell, 65th U.S. Secretary of State
 John Foster Dulles, 52nd U.S. Secretary of State
 Carol Z. Perez, current Director General of the Foreign Service
 Michelle Giuda, 30th Assistant Secretary of State for Public Diplomacy and Public Affairs
 Tibor P. Nagy, 19th Assistant Secretary of State for African Affairs
 Richard Boucher, 6th Assistant Secretary of State for South and Central Asian Affairs
 James E. Webb, former United States Under Secretary of State
 Heather Higginbottom, former Deputy Secretary of State for Management and Resources
 Grant S. Green, former Under Secretary of State for Management
 John F. W. Rogers, former Under Secretary of State for Management
 Heather Nauert, former Under Secretary of State for Public Diplomacy and Public Affairs
 John D. Holum, former Under Secretary of State for Arms Control and International Security Affairs 
 Robert Daniel Murphy, former Under Secretary of State for Political Affairs and Assistant Secretary of State for International Organization Affairs
 Carol Laise, former Assistant Secretary of State for Public Affairs
 Brooks Hays, former Assistant Secretary of State for Legislative Affairs 
 J. Edward Fox, former Assistant Secretary of State for Legislative Affairs 
 Robert J. McCloskey, former Assistant Secretary of State for Legislative Affairs 
 William Tapley Bennett Jr., former Assistant Secretary of State for Legislative Affairs
 Nelson T. Johnson, former Assistant Secretary of State for East Asian and Pacific Affairs
 Eileen Claussen, former Assistant Secretary of State for Oceans and International Environmental and Scientific Affairs
 John Peurifoy, former Assistant Secretary of State for Administration
 Randall M. Fort, former Assistant Secretary of State for Intelligence and Research
 Gregory B. Starr, former Assistant Secretary of State for Diplomatic Security
 William Braucher Wood, former Assistant Secretary of State for International Organization Affairs
 Rose Gottemoeller, Assistant Secretary of State for Verification, Compliance, and Implementation
 Julius Katz, former Assistant Secretary of State for Economic and Business Affairs
 David Marchick, former Deputy Assistant Secretary of State for Economic and Business Affairs
 Robert M. Sayre, former Inspector General of the State Department and Coordinator for Counterterrorism

Other diplomats

 Nestor Mendez, current Assistant Secretary General of the Organization of American States
 Kazuyuki Hamada, former Vice Minister of Foreign Affairs of Japan
 Anwar Gargash, current Minister of State for Foreign Affairs of the United Arab Emirates
 Pearnel Patroe Charles Jr., current State Minister of Foreign Affairs & Trade of Jamaica
 Carl Lutz, Swiss diplomat credited with saving over 62,000 Jews, the largest rescue operation of Jews of World War II
 George Maior, current Romanian ambassador to the United States
 Henrique Valle, Deputy Ambassador of Brazil to the United Nations
 Joe Hung, Taiwanese Ambassador to Italy
 Elliott Charng, Taiwanese Ambassador to Australia, New Zealand, and India
 Camillo Gonsalves, Permanent Representatives of Saint Vincent and the Grenadines to the United Nations
 Moncrieff J. Spear, former U.S. Consul-General to the Bahamas
 Richard Paul Momsen, former U.S. Consul-General to Rio de Janeiro
 Guilford Wiley Wells, former U.S. Consul-General to Shanghai
 Thomas Sammons, former U.S. Consul-General to Shanghai
 Frank Lockhart, former U.S. Consul-General to Shanghai
 Archer Blood, former U.S. Consul-General to Dhaka, East Pakistan, issued the Blood Telegram during the Bangladesh Liberation War
 An Le, current U.S. Consul to Ho Chi Minh City
 Michael Ratney, U.S. Special Envoy to Syria under President Obama
 Mao Ning, current spokesperson of the Ministry of Foreign Affairs of China

Law

U.S. Circuit Judges

 Sharon Prost, current Chief Judge of the U.S. Court of Appeals for the Federal Circuit
 Richard Linn, current Senior Judge of the U.S. Court of Appeals for the Federal Circuit
 Clyde H. Hamilton, current Senior Judge of the U.S. Court of Appeals for the Fourth Circuit
 Kenneth Francis Ripple, current Senior Judge of the U.S. Court of Appeals for the Seventh Circuit
 David R. Hansen, current Senior Judge of the U.S. Court of Appeals for the Eighth Circuit
 Barbara Milano Keenan, current Judge of the U.S. Court of Appeals for the Fourth Circuit
 Carlos F. Lucero, current Judge of the U.S. Court of Appeals for the Tenth Circuit
 Glenn L. Archer Jr., former Chief Judge of the U.S. Court of Appeals for the Federal Circuit
 Randall Ray Rader, former Chief Judge of the U.S. Court of Appeals for the Federal Circuit
 James P. Coleman, former Chief Judge of the U.S. Court of Appeals for the Fifth Circuit
 Richard Dickson Cudahy, former Senior Judge of the U.S. Court of Appeals for the Seventh Circuit
 William Edward Doyle, former Senior Judge of the U.S. Court of Appeals for the Tenth Circuit
 Bennett Champ Clark, former Judge of the U.S. Court of Appeals for the District of Columbia Circuit
 Albert Tate Jr., former Judge of the U.S. Court of Appeals for the Fifth Circuit
 Robert Smith Vance, former Judge of the U.S. Court of Appeals for the Eleventh Circuit

U.S. District Judges

 John Michael Seabright, current Chief Judge of the U.S. District Court for the District of Hawaii
 Joyce Hens Green, current Senior Judge of the U.S. District Court for the District of Columbia
 Daniel T. K. Hurley, current Senior Judge of the U.S. District Court for the Southern District of Florida
 Cameron McGowan Currie, current Senior Judge of the U.S. District Court for the District of South Carolina
 Roger L. Hunt, current Senior Judge of the U.S. District Court for the District of Nevada
 William K. Sessions III, current Senior Judge of the U.S. District Court for the District of Vermont 
 Gordon Jay Quist, current Senior Judge of the U.S. District Court for the Western District of Michigan 
 Suzanne Mitchell, current Magistrate Judge of the U.S. District Court for the Western District of Oklahoma
 Tanya S. Chutkan, current Judge of the U.S. District Court for the District of Columbia
 Stephen Victor Wilson, current Judge of the U.S. District Court for the Central District of California
 Darrin P. Gayles, current Judge of the U.S. District Court for the District of Florida
 Jorge Luis Alonso, current Judge of the U.S. District Court for the Northern District of Illinois
 Catherine Eagles, current Judge of the U.S. District Court for the Middle District of North Carolina
 Linda Vivienne Parker, current Judge of the U.S. District Court for the Eastern District of Michigan
 Alfred Adams Wheat, former Chief Judge of the U.S. District Court for the District of Columbia
 Gerald Ellis Rosen, former Chief Judge of the U.S. District Court for the Eastern District of Michigan
 Ernest W. Gibson Jr., former Chief Judge of the U.S. District Court for the District of Vermont
 James C. Cacheris, former Chief Judge of the U.S. District Court for the Eastern District of Virginia
 Edward Skottowe Northrop, former Chief Judge of the U.S. District Court for the District of Maryland
 Edwin F. Hunter, former Chief Judge of the U.S. District Court for the Western District of Louisiana
 Ronald Edward Meredith, former Chief Judge of the U.S. District Court for the Western District of Kentucky
 James F. Battin, former Chief Judge of the U.S. District Court for the District of Montana
 Harold H. Greene, former Senior Judge of the U.S. District Court for the District of Columbia
 Henry Albert Schweinhaut, former Senior Judge of the U.S. District Court for the District of Columbia
 James Robertson, former Senior Judge of the U.S. District Court for the District of Columbia
 Burnita Shelton Matthews, former Senior Judge of the U.S. District Court for the District of Columbia
 Sarah T. Hughes, former Senior Judge of the U.S. District Court for the Northern District of Texas 
 Oren Ritter Lewis, former Senior Judge of the U.S. District Court for the Eastern District of Virginia
 John Milton Killits, former Senior Judge of the U.S. District Court for the Northern District of Ohio
 Albert Morris Sames, former Senior Judge of the U.S. District Court for the District of Arizona
 Albert Sherman Christensen, former Senior Judge of the U.S. District Court for the District of Utah
 G. Ross Anderson, former Senior Judge of the U.S. District Court for the District of South Carolina
 Paul Benson, former Senior Judge of the U.S. District Court for the District of North Dakota
 Frederick Lincoln Siddons, former Judge of the U.S. District Court for the District of Columbia
 Adolph A. Hoehling Jr., former Judge of the U.S. District Court for the District of Columbia
 Andrew Coyle Bradley, former Judge of the U.S. District Court for the District of Columbia
 William Matthews Merrick, former Judge of the U.S. District Court for the District of Columbia
 James Robert Kirkland, former Judge of the U.S. District Court for the District of Columbia
 William Edward Doyle, former Judge of the U.S. District Court for the District of Colorado
 Arthur Marshall Davis, former Judge of the U.S. District Court for the District of Arizona
 Benjamin Franklin Keller, former Judge of the U.S. District Court for the Southern District of West Virginia
 David R. Hansen, former Judge of the U.S. District Court for the Northern District of Iowa
 Clyde H. Hamilton, former Judge of the U.S. District Court for the District of South Carolina

U.S. State Supreme Courts

 Michael Kruse, current Chief Justice of the American Samoa High Court
 Bill Mims, current Justice of the Virginia Supreme Court
 D. Frank Wilkins, current Justice of the Utah Supreme Court
 Harry L. Carrico, 23rd Chief Justice of the Virginia Supreme Court
 Barbara Milano Keenan, Justice on the Virginia Supreme Court
 Barbara Pariente, 51st Chief Justice of the Florida Supreme Court
 Clifford Taylor, 66th Chief Justice of the Michigan Supreme Court
 Mary S. Coleman, 57th Chief Justice of the Michigan Supreme Court
 A. Lee Chandler, 28th Chief Justice of the South Carolina Supreme Court
 Taylor Hudnall Stukes, 20th Chief Justice of the South Carolina Supreme Court
 Russell A. Anderson, 20th Chief Justice of the Minnesota Supreme Court
 Horace W. Wilkie, 19th Chief Justice of the Wisconsin Supreme Court
 Kathryn Werdegar, former Justice of the Supreme Court of California
 Albert Tate Jr., former Justice of the Louisiana Supreme Court
 Rankin Gibson, former Justice of the Ohio Supreme Court
 Adolph Grant Wolf, former Justice of the Puerto Rico Supreme Court
 Félix Córdova Dávila, former Justice of the Puerto Rico Supreme Court

Attorneys General

 William Barr, 77th and 85th United States Attorney General
 Mohan Peiris, 41st Attorney General of Sri Lanka
 Aaron D. Ford, current Attorney General of Nevada
 Frankie Sue Del Papa, 29th Attorney General of Nevada
 Bill Mims, 45th Attorney General of Virginia
 John Garland Pollard, 21st Attorney General of Virginia
 Robert Y. Thornton, 8th Attorney General of Oregon
 Rufus L. Edmisten, 46th Attorney General of North Carolina
 Vernon B. Romney, 14th Attorney General of Utah
 Frank Willey Clancy, 1st Attorney General of New Mexico
 Jeffrey B. Pine, 70th Attorney General of Rhode Island
 M. Jerome Diamond, 22nd Attorney General of Vermont
 Joseph Foster, 29th Attorney General of New Hampshire
 Grace Berg Schaible, 20th Attorney General of Alaska
 Jack Conway, 49th Attorney General of Kentucky
 Paul Benson, 22nd Attorney General of North Dakota
 Robert E. Smylie, 21st Attorney General of Idaho
 Winston Bryant, 52nd Attorney General of Arkansas
 James P. Coleman, 33rd Attorney General of Mississippi
 John A. Carver Jr., interim Attorney General of American Samoa
 William C. Wantland, former Attorney General of the Seminole Nation

International judges
 Hsu Mo, Founding Judge of the International Court of Justice
 Tshering Wangchuk, current Chief Justice of the Supreme Court of Bhutan
 Mohan Peiris, de facto Chief Justice of the Supreme Court of Sri Lanka
 José Abad Santos, 5th Chief Justice of the Supreme Court of the Philippines

Other legal figures

 Andrew P. Bakaj, Former Department of Defense and CIA Official; lead counsel for the Whisteblower during the Impeachment Inquiry and the subsequent Impeachment of President Donald Trump.
 Scott W. Stucky, current Chief Judge of the U.S. Court of Appeals for the Armed Forces
 Leon Jaworski, Special Prosecutor during the Watergate scandal
 Belva Ann Lockwood, first woman to argue before the U.S. Supreme Court, first female presidential candidate
 Ira Sorkin, Lead Attorney for Bernard Madoff
 Joyce Hens Green, Presiding Judge of the U.S. Foreign Intelligence Surveillance Court
 Thomas F. Hogan, Presiding Judge of the U.S. Foreign Intelligence Surveillance Court
 William Barberie Howell, Chief Judge of the U.S. Customs Court
 Wilma B. Liebman, Chair of the National Labor Relations Board
 Delbert Spurlock, General Counsel of the Army
 Makan Delrahim, United States Assistant Attorney General for the Antitrust Division
 William K. Sessions III, Chair of the U.S. Sentencing Commission
 Ken Starr, 39th Solicitor General of the United States
 Omar Ashmawy, Chief Counsel to the Office of Congressional Ethics
 Bradley Schlozman, Head of the United States Department of Justice Civil Rights Division
 Glenn Greenwald, Pulitzer Prize-winning legal author that exposed the United States surveillance of foreign leaders
 William D. Cohen, associate justice of the Vermont Supreme Court
 Chester Sipkin, Administrative Law Judge for the United States Department of Justice Immigration and Naturalization Service.

Military

 General John William Vessey, Jr., 10th Chairman of the Joint Chiefs of Staff
 General Colin Powell, 12th Chairman of the Joint Chiefs of Staff
 Admiral David E. Jeremiah, interim Chairman of the Joint Chiefs of Staff
 General John Shalikashvili, 13th Chairman of the Joint Chiefs of Staff
 General Peter Pace, 16th Chairman of the Joint Chiefs of Staff
 General Robert T. Herres, 1st Vice Chairman of the Joint Chiefs of Staff
 Admiral William Owens, 3rd Vice Chairman of the Joint Chiefs of Staff
 Admiral Thad Allen (MPA), Commandant of the Coast Guard 2006–2010
 General Earl E. Anderson (J.D.)
 Rear Admiral Richard A. Appelbaum
 Captain Edward L. Beach, Jr. (M.A.)
 Major General Thomas A. Benes
 Brigadier General Vincente T. Blaz
 Major General Robert D. Bohn
 Lieutenant General Arnold W. Braswell, United States Air Force, MBA, 1967
 Rear Admiral F. Taylor Brown
 Major General George William Casey, Sr.
 General John T. Chain, Jr., former Commander of the Strategic Air Command
 Rear Admiral Sandy Daniels
 Major General Sharon K.G. Dunbar, U.S. Air Force
 Captain Frank Freyer, 14th Naval Governor of Guam and Chief of Staff of the Peruvian Navy
 General John Fugh, the first Chinese American to attain general officer status in the U.S. Army, former Judge Advocate General
 General Charles A. Gabriel, 11th Chief of Staff of the United States Air Force
 Admiral John B. Hayes (M.A.) Commandant of the Coast Guard (Ret.) 1978–1982
 General Robert T. Herres, the first Vice Chairman of the Joint Chiefs of Staff
 Admiral David E. Jeremiah, former Vice Chairman of the Joint Chiefs of Staff and also Acting Chairman of the Joint Chiefs of Staff
 General Charles C. Krulak, former Commandant of the United States Marine Corps
 Major General Bruce M. Lawlor (B.S., J.D., D.Sc.), first commander of Joint Task Force-Civil Support and first Chief of Staff at the Department of Homeland Security
 Brigadier General Michael A. McAuliffe
 Lieutenant General Thomas McInerney
 Lieutenant General John N. McLaughlin, Marine Corps service in three wars and spent three years as P.O.W.
 General Merrill A. McPeak, former Chief of Staff of the United States Air Force and United States Secretary of the Air Force
 Major General Billy Mitchell (1919, but received degree as part of "class of 1899", having dropped out to serve in the Spanish–American War), advocate of air power in the military
 Lieutenant General Hal Moore, author of We Were Soldiers Once… and Young
 Major General Spurgeon Neel, father of army aviation medicine
 Major General Peter George Olenchuk
 Major General Edwin P. Parker Jr., Class of 1912, Commander of the 78th Infantry Division during World War II (August 1942 – November 1945)
 General Frank E. Petersen, United States Marine Corps, first black Marine general, first black Marine aviator, first black commanding officer of a fighter squadron, an air group, and a major base.
 Major General Herman Poggemeyer Jr., United States Marine Corps,
 Vice Admiral John R. Ryan, former Superintendent of United States Naval Academy, Chancellor of the State University of New York
 Major General Michael P. Ryan, United States Marine Corps, Co-founded Marine Corps Marathon
 Brigadier General Henry J. Stehling
 Major General William W. Stickney, United States Marine Corps, Director of Marine Corps Reserve
 Bill Studeman, former Admiral of the United States Navy, former deputy director of the Central Intelligence Agency, former acting director of Central Intelligence, former director of the National Security Agency, and former director of Naval Intelligence
 Brigadier General Dennis B. Sullivan
 Colonel John Tweedale (LL.B.) Medal of Honor recipient, 1868
 Brigadier General James P. Ulm
 Major General Hoyt S. Vandenberg, Jr.
 Rear Admiral Sidney A. Wallace
 General Larry D. Welch, the 12th Chief of Staff of the United States Air Force, Commander, Strategic Air Command
 Major General Don S. Wenger
 Major General Charles F. Widdecke (M.A.); recipient of Navy Cross during World War II
 Brigadier General Hugh E. Wild
 Brigadier General David W. Winn

Journalism

 Chris Anderson, editor-in-chief of Wired
 Bob Woodward, editor at The Washington Post, famous for reporting on the Watergate scandal
 Dana Bash, CNN White House correspondent
 Kate Bolduan, CNN correspondent
 Hadas Gold, media and business reporter for CNN and CNN International
 Diana B. Henriques, reporter for the New York Times
 Kasie Hunt, host of MSNBC's Kasie DC
 Jeff Jacoby, columnist for The Boston Globe
 Matt Katz, reporter for WNYC and New Jersey Public Radio.
 Michael Kinsley, political commentator and journalist, former co-host of CNN's Crossfire
 Sally Kohn, CNN and Fox News commentator
 Brian Williams, former NBC Nightly News anchor
 Doug McKelway, Fox News journalist
 Marianne Means, White House correspondent
 Nazenin Ansari, Voice of America correspondent 
 Margaret Carlson, journalist; columnist for Bloomberg News; first woman columnist at Time
 Mona Charen, political analyst and best-selling author
 Victoria Clarke, CNN analyst, former Assistant Secretary of Defense for Public Affairs
 Bob Considine, journalist with United Press International and author
 Geovanny Vicente, Political strategist and columnist for CNN
 Rowland Evans (1951), news commentator from CNN's Evans, Novak, Hunt and Shields
 Steve Benen, lead blogger of The Washington Monthly
 Bill Gertz reporter and analyst for The Washington Times and Fox News
 Glenn Greenwald, former attorney and current political and legal blogger, and columnist at Salon
 Kathleen Troia McFarland, former Deputy Assistant Secretary of Defense for Public Affairs, Fox News commentator
 Philip Klein, executive editor of the Washington Examiner
 Michael Moran, author of The Reckoning; producer of the documentary series Crisis Guides
 Glenn R. Simpson, journalist for Wall Street Journal
 Lieutenant General Thomas McInerney, Fox News pundit
 Mosheh Oinounou, executive producer of CBS News
 Mark Olshaker, author who collaborates with FBI agent, John E. Douglas in books regarding criminal and investigative psychology
 Michael Punke, writer, novelist, professor, policy analyst, policy consultant, attorney best known for writing the novel The Revenant (2002), which was adapted into film as The Revenant (2015)
 Josh Rogin, CNN political analyst
 Hilary Rosen, on-air contributor for CNN; consultant, political director and Washington editor at large for The Huffington Post; former CEO of the RIAA
 Bhaskar Sunkara, founding editor and publisher of Jacobin
 Chuck Todd (1991), NBC News political director
 Murray Waas, award-winning journalist and author, The New Yorker, The Los Angeles Times, The Nation, The Village Voice, The National Journal, and The Boston Globe

Pulitzer Prize

 Anders Gyllenhaal, Chairman of the Pulitzer Prize Board 
 Emily Green, One of the inaugural recipients of the Pulitzer Prize for Audio Reporting in 2020 for her work with This American Life concerning the personal impact of the "Remain in Mexico" policy
 Glenn Greenwald, winner of the 2014 Pulitzer Prize for Public Service
 Diana B. Henriques, winner of the 2002 Pulitzer Prize for Public Service
 Bob Woodward, winner of the 2002 Pulitzer Prize for National Reporting and the 1973 Pulitzer Prize for Public Service
 Deborah Solomon, winner of the 2002 Pulitzer Prize for Explanatory Reporting
 Ginger Thompson, winner of the 2001 Pulitzer Prize for National Reporting
 William McPherson, winner of the 1973 Pulitzer Prize for Criticism
 Michael Kammen, winner of the 1973 Pulitzer Prize for History
 George D. Beveridge, winner of the 1957 Pulitzer Prize for Local Reporting

Activism

 Tom Fitton, current President of Judicial Watch
 Roslyn Brock, Chairman of the NAACP
 Alex Pacheco, Co-founder and Chairman of PETA – People for the Ethical Treatment of Animals
 Jonathan D. Katz (BA '81), Founder of Queer Nation
 Raul Yzaguirre, President & CEO of the National Council of La Raza
 Kati Marton, Chairwoman of the International Women's Health Coalition
 Paul Shapiro, Vice President of the Humane Society of the United States
 A. L. Steiner, Co-founder of Working Artists and the Greater Economy (W.A.G.E.)
 Stephanie K. Meeks, CEO of the National Trust for Historic Preservation
 Leah Soibel, Executive Director of Fuente Latina
 Nicholas Eftimiades, founder of the Federation of Galaxy Explorers
 Marc Garlasco, senior military expert for Human Rights Watch
 Bari Lurie, chief of staff at the Clinton Foundation
 Amien Rais, leader of the Indonesian reform movement
 Jason Franklin, urban policy activist
 Margery E. Goldberg, public arts activist
 Nikolas Schiller, cannabis reform activist
 Mercedes Schlapp, Tea Party movement activist
 Richard A. Fowler, American political activist
 Dorothy Vredenburgh Bush, American political activist
 Jeanne Henriquez, women's rights activist
 Ida Hinman, American suffragette and feminist activist
 Arlene Raven, feminist activist 
 Rita Banerji, gender activist
 Watson Davis, science education activist
 Richard Cizik, environmental activist
 Jane Briggs Hart, anti-war activist
 Brittany Lewis, domestic violence activist
 Omega Silva, universal health care activist
 Ángel Lozada, HIV activist
 Kim A. Snyder, chronic fatigue syndrome activist
 Peggy Cooper Cafritz, American civil rights activist
 David A. Clarke, American civil rights activist
 Kivutha Kibwana, Kenyan human rights activist
 Kraisak Choonhavan, Thai human rights activist
 Wong Chin Foo, Chinese-American activist
 Henry Berg-Brousseau, Transgender rights activist

Entertainment

 Alec Baldwin, actor (did not graduate)
 Casey Affleck, actor (did not graduate)
 Courteney Cox (Mt. Vernon alumni), actress
 Kerry Washington (1998), actress
 Rachel Zoe, celebrity fashion stylist
 Ina Garten, host of Barefoot Contessa
 Dan Glickman (JD 1969), current president of the Motion Picture Association of America
 T.J. Miller, actor and stand-up comedian, Silicon Valley
 Angela Aki, singer-songwriter (Final Fantasy XII)
 Patricia Altschul, socialite and art collector
 William Peter Blatty, writer and filmmaker who wrote the novel The Exorcist (1971) and the subsequent screenplay version for which he won an Academy Award
 Reem Bassous, visual artist
 Irvin Bomb, artist
 Warren Brown, TV host on the Food Network
 Christopher Pearse Cranch, writer and artist
 Merce Cunningham (attended), dancer and choreographer
 Manish Dayal, actor, known for 90210
 Lester del Rey, author, founded Del Rey Books
 Donna Dixon, actress, wife of Dan Aykroyd
 Haddaway, Trinidadian singer most famous for "What Is Love" single
 Kevin Peter Hall, actor, Predator
 Haroon, graduate in Business Administration, Pakistani singer, composer, musician and engineer
 Reona Ito, music conductor (alumnus of the Elliott School)
 Chris Kilmore, turntablist for the band Incubus
 Ross Martin, Television-Film-Radio actor-Most famous for his role on TV in the Wild, Wild West
 Rooney Mara (attended), actress, The Girl with the Dragon Tattoo
 Dina Merrill, actress and socialite
 Isaac Fitzgerald, writer
 Naeto C, Nigerian rapper
 Lee Phillip, Korean American actor
 Adam Richman (attended for one year), indie pop singer-songwriter
 Mark Russell, satirist and comedian
 Whitney Sudler-Smith, television personality and socialite
 Clay Travis, sports columnist and author
 Bill Westenhofer, Academy Award-winning visual effects artist
 Nathan Hale Williams, film and television producer, entertainment lawyer
 Scott Wolf (1991), actor
 Emily Axford, actor
 Taylor Hale, winner of Big Brother 24, Miss Michigan USA 2021
 Eliza McLamb, singer-songwriter and podcast host (did not graduate)
 Ned Bittinger, portrait painter and illustrator

First Family and royalty

 Jacqueline Bouvier Kennedy Onassis, First Lady of the United States
 Princess Reema bint Bandar Al Saud of Saudi Arabia
 Princess Sonam Dechen Wangchuck of Bhutan
 Princess Yasmine Pahlavi of Persia
 Elisabeth Delatour Préval, First Lady of Haiti
 Susan Ford, daughter of U.S. President Gerald Ford
 Margaret Truman, daughter of U.S. President Harry S. Truman
 Lynda Bird Johnson, daughter of U.S. President Lyndon Johnson
 David Eisenhower, grandson of President Dwight Eisenhower and son-in-law of President Richard Nixon

Religion

 Bernard P. Brockbank, member of the First Quorum of the Seventy of the Church of Jesus Christ of Latter-day Saints
 J. Reuben Clark, member of the Quorum of the Twelve Apostles of the Church of Jesus Christ of Latter-day Saints
 Matthew Cowley, member of the Quorum of the Twelve Apostles of the Church of Jesus Christ of Latter-day Saints
 Frank Joseph Dewane, Roman Catholic Bishop of Venice, Florida
 Violet L. Fisher, Bishop of the United Methodist Church 
 Jonathan Hausman, Rabbi of Ahavath Torah
 L. Ron Hubbard, founder of the Church of Scientology
 George V. Murry, Roman Catholic Bishop of Youngstown
 Gregory V. Palmer, Bishop of the United Methodist Church
 Richard G. Scott, member of the Quorum of the Twelve Apostles of the Church of Jesus Christ of Latter-day Saints
 Marc Stanley, Chairman of the National Jewish Democratic Council
 William C. Wantland, Episcopal Bishop of Eau Claire

Sciences

 Patch Adams, physician and comedian portrayed in a 1998 movie
 Yousef Alhorr, environmentalist known for his work in the field of sustainable built environment and climate actions
 Ralph Alpher, "Father of the Big Bang theory"
 Anousheh Ansari (M.S., 1992), chairwoman and co-founder of Prodea Systems; patroness of private space flight; first female space tourist
 Paul Antony, Chief Medical Officer of Pharmaceutical Research and Manufacturers of America
 Serena M. Auñón, American physician, engineer, and NASA astronaut. 
 Julius Axelrod, biochemist who won a share of the Nobel Prize in Physiology or Medicine in 1970 along with Bernard Katz and Ulf von Euler
 Neal D. Barnard, physician, author, clinical researcher, founding president of the Physicians Committee for Responsible Medicine
 Jessie G. Beach, American paleontologist and museum aid.
 Patricia Wilson Berger, President of the American Library Association
 Paul S. Berry, HIV researcher
 Dr. Lisa Bowleg, professor of Applied Social Psychology
 L. Ron Hubbard, writer of Dianetics, the Modern Science of Mental Health, a science of the mind.
 Jennifer Boykin, president of Newport News Shipbuilding and vice president of Huntington Ingalls Industries
 James Carroll, President of the United States and Canadian Academy of Pathology
 Peter Caws, President of the International Society for the Systems Sciences
 Captain Michael Coats (1977), astronaut and Space Shuttle Commander
 Charles Critchfield, physicist of the Manhattan Project
 Frederick D. Gregory, interim Administrator of NASA
 Michael Griffin, 11th Administrator of NASA
 Todd B. Hawley, co-founder of the International Space University
 Nancy B. Jackson, President of the American Chemical Society
 Howard Judd, menopause expert and medical researcher
 Albert Freeman Africanus King (MD 1861), personal physician to President Abraham Lincoln
 Allenna Leonard, President of the International Society for the Systems Sciences
 Hans Lineweaver (B.A. 1930, M.A. 1933), physical chemist who developed the Lineweaver–Burk plot
 Marcus Ward Lyon Jr., President of the American Society of Mammalogists
 James Morhard, 14th Deputy-Administrator of NASA
 Constance Tom Noguchi, sickle cell disease researcher, NIDDK
 Matthew Stirling, ethnologist and archaeologist who discovered and excavated many pre-Columbian Mesoamerican sites
 James E. Webb, 2nd Administrator of NASA
 Ashani Weeraratna, cancer researcher

Athletics

 Theodore N. Lerner (1948), owner of the Washington Nationals
 Abe Pollin (1945), owner of the Washington Wizards and Washington Capitals
 Jerry Reinsdorf (1957), owner of the Chicago White Sox and Chicago Bulls
 Randy Levine (B.A., 1977), President of the New York Yankees
 Red Auerbach (1940, 1941), President of the Boston Celtics
 David Haggerty, current President of the International Tennis Federation
 Jeffrey Pollack, Commissioner of the World Series of Poker
 Chet Simmons, 1st Commissioner of the United States Football League
 Joel Segal ('86), sports agent, 2016 "The NFL's 100 Most Important People" and Forbes "World's Most Powerful Sports Agents"
 Brendon Ayanbadejo (MBA, 2013), football player, Super Bowl champion, Baltimore Ravens
 Mike Brey (1982), current head coach, Notre Dame men's basketball team
 Moti Daniel (1987), Israeli, played in the Israeli Basketball Premier League and for the Israel national basketball team
 Yinka Dare (attended 1993–1994), basketball player, New Jersey Nets
 David Falk (J.D., 1975), sports agent
 John Flaherty (1988), former Major League Baseball player
 Mike Hall (2006), basketball forward, Washington Wizards and overseas leagues, free agent
 Ray Hanken (1911–1980), football player
 Wayne Hart (1912), member of the All-South Atlantic football team for four years; coached Washington Vigilants and Clemson Agricultural College
 Lubomir Kavalek (1975), Chess Grandmaster
 Tuffy Leemans (1936), football running back, Pro Football Hall of Fame, New York Giants
 Ivan Leshinsky (born 1947), American-Israeli basketball player
 Larry MacPhail, National Baseball Hall of Fame inductee
 Pops Mensah-Bonsu (2006), basketball forward, Galatasaray S.K.
 Ronnie Nunn, former referee for the National Basketball Association
 Michael O'Connor (2002), baseball pitcher, Washington Nationals
 Sam Perlozzo (1973), former manager, Baltimore Orioles; current third base coach, Seattle Mariners
 J. R. Pinnock (2006), basketball guard
 Justin Prinstein, inaugural player in the Israel Baseball League
 Gregg Ritchie (1987), former MLB hitting coach, Pittsburgh Pirates; head coach George Washington Colonials baseball since 2013
 William W. Skinner, head football coach for University of Maryland, College Park and University of Arizona
 Mike Sommer (1958), member of college football team, played in the NFL with the Washington Redskins, Baltimore Colts, and the Oakland Raiders
 Jim Tennant, former MLB player
 Jack Toomay, former Major League Baseball player 
 Yuta Watanabe, Japanese NBA player
 Bernie Wolfe (born 1951), NHL hockey player
 Seth Rudolph, professional soccer player
 Tom Walter, head baseball coach for Wake Forest University
 Jonquel  Jones, basketball center for the Connecticut Sun and 2021 WNBA MVP

Olympics
 Elana Meyers (BS '06, MA '11), bobsledder at the 2018 Winter Olympics and 2014 Winter Olympics
 Patricio Garino, basketball player at the 2016 Summer Olympics
 Pops Mensah-Bonsu, basketball player at the 2012 Summer Olympics
 Alice Schmidt, runner at the 2008 Summer Olympics and 2012 Summer Olympics
 Aquil Abdullah, rower at the 2004 Summer Olympics
 Sameera Al-Bitar, swimmer at the 2008 Summer Olympics and the 2004 Summer Olympics
 Álvaro Fortuny, swimmer at the 2004 Summer Olympics and the 2000 Summer Olympics
 Chad Senior, pentathlete at the 2004 Summer Olympics and the 2000 Summer Olympics
 Ugo Oha, basketball player at the 2004 Summer Olympics
 Ben Stevens, President of the 2001 Special Olympics World Winter Games
 Dallas Shirley, basketball player at the 1960 Summer Olympics
 Josiah Henson, wrestler at the 1952 Summer Olympics
 Gerald F. Russell, runner at the 1940 Summer Olympics

Other

 Anwar al-Awlaki, terrorist and principal member of al-Qaeda
 John Calder Brennan (Law, 1937), historian
 Barbara Bush (Honorary Doctor of Public Service degree), First Lady of the United States
 George Herbert Walker Bush (Honorary Doctor of Public Service degree), President of the United States
 Robert L. Dale (Pilot for the National Science Foundation)
 Cathryn S. Dippo, statistician
 Harrison Howell Dodge (1852–1937), appointed as resident superintendent of Mount Vernon in 1885, serving 52 years in the position until his death
 Alfred McAdams, painter
 Gustavo A. Mellander, AB, MA, PhD (History −1966) University dean for 15 years; College president for 20 years.
 Mona Al Munajjed, United Nations official
 Frank Robinson (Honorary Doctor of Public Service degree), Baseball Hall of Famer, manager of the Washington Nationals
 Jackie Ronne, Antarctic explorer, and the first woman in the world to be a working member of an Antarctic expedition
 Nikolas Schiller, mapmaker
 Roger Stone, opposition research consultant for the Republican National Committee
 Harry Aubrey Toulmin Sr. (1882), patent attorney to the Wright Brothers
 Geovanny Vicente, CNN columnist and political strategist.
 John Appleton Wilson, architect

References

alumni
George Washington University alumni
Lists of people by educational affiliation in Washington, D.C.